The fair brocket (Mazama tienhoveni), also known as the white brocket deer or  to locals, is a possible species of brocket deer from the south-central Amazon near the Aripuanã River in Brazil.

The coloration of the fair brocket is characterized by an overall light brown, grading toward almost white on the sides and ventrally, in contrast to the dorsal parts of M. americana, which are of a deep reddish-brown color, grading ventrally into a more rusty color, and those of M. nemorivaga which are dull or pale yellowish or grayish brown to chestnut brown, grading ventrally into yellowish or whitish.

References

Mazama (genus)
Controversial mammal taxa
Mammals described in 2015